Tam Phước is a ward located in Biên Hòa city of Đồng Nai province, Vietnam. It has an area of about 45.1km2 and the population in 2018 was 53,731.

It is the largest ward in Biên Hòa city by area.

References

Bien Hoa